Laurie Louise Smith Camp (November 28, 1953 – September 23, 2020) was a United States district judge of the United States District Court for the District of Nebraska.

Early life and education

Born in Omaha, Nebraska, Smith Camp graduated from Stanford University with her Bachelor of Arts degree in 1974 and later from the University of Nebraska–Lincoln College of Law, where she earned her Juris Doctor in 1977.

Legal career

Smith Camp started her legal career as an Associate General Counsel with the First National Bank & Trust Company from 1977 to 1978. She later was in private practice from 1978 to 1980. Later in 1980, she was employed as the General Counsel for the Nebraska Department of Correctional Services where she served until 1991. In 1991, Smith Camp became the Chief of the civil rights section for the Nebraska Department of Justice until 1995. She was a Chief Deputy Attorney General for criminal matters with the Nebraska Department of Justice from 1995 until her nomination to the federal bench in 2001.

Federal judicial career

In 2001, Smith Camp was nominated to the United States District Court for the District of Nebraska by President George W. Bush on September 4, 2001 to a seat vacated by William G. Cambridge.  She was confirmed by the Senate on October 23, 2001 and received her commission the next day. She served as Chief Judge from December 1, 2011 to November 1, 2018. She assumed senior status on December 1, 2018. Her service terminated on September 23, 2020, due to her death in Omaha.

References

Sources

1953 births
2020 deaths
Stanford University alumni
University of Nebraska College of Law alumni
Judges of the United States District Court for the District of Nebraska
United States district court judges appointed by George W. Bush
21st-century American judges
Lawyers from Omaha, Nebraska
21st-century American women judges